Nordmannslågen is a lake in the municipality of Eidfjord in Vestland county, Norway. At , it is the largest lake in Hordaland county. The lake lies on the great Hardangervidda plateau in the central part of the Hardangervidda National Park. The lake is part of the headwaters of the river Numedalslågen.

See also
List of lakes in Norway

References

Eidfjord
Lakes of Vestland